Lac Bleu d'Ilhéou is a lake in Hautes-Pyrénées, France. At an elevation of 1976 m, its surface area is 0.113 km².

Lakes of Hautes-Pyrénées